Tom Ellis (born 29 September 1994 in Parbrook, England) is an English professional rugby union footballer. He played at lock for Bath before moving to flanker, where he usually plays at 6, the blindside flanker.

In May 2017 he was invited to a training camp with the senior England squad by Eddie Jones.

References

External links
Premiership Rugby Profile
European Professional Club Rugby Profile
Bath Rugby Profile

1994 births
Living people
Bath Rugby players
English rugby union players
Rugby union players from Somerset
Rugby union flankers
People educated at Millfield